Lake Mill is an unincorporated community in Ohio Township, Spencer County, in the U.S. state of Indiana.

It is located just north of the unincorporated community of Reo.

Geography

References

Unincorporated communities in Spencer County, Indiana
Unincorporated communities in Indiana